Ambulyx flavocelebensis is a species of moth of the  family Sphingidae. It is known from Sulawesi.

References

Ambulyx
Moths described in 2009
Moths of Indonesia